So You Fell In Love With A Musician... is the second solo album by guitarist Pat Smear, released by SST Records in 1992. A music video, filmed by Dave Markey, was made for the song "Innocent X". The song "Creep Street", was originally recorded by Smears' previous, short-lived band Vagina Dentata, and their version of the song was released in 2012 on the compilation Chaotic Reasoning Vol. 2.

Critical reception
Trouser Press wrote that "Smear’s goofy enthusiasm, cool playing and the whole thing’s casual, underproduced quality give it a crummy, ass-backwards sort of charm."

Track listing
 I'll Find You (Pat Smear) – 3:35
 Lulu Belle (Pat Smear, Jena) – 2:05
 Creep Street (Michelle Bell, Pat Smear, Gary Jacoby) – 4:02
 Holy Bulsara (Pat Smear) – 3:01
 Ever Alone With Thee (Pat Smear) – 1:54
 All My Cheating (Pat Smear) – 4:37
 Innocent X (Pat Smear) – 6:49
 Cold Towne (Pat Smear) – 2:15
 Yummy Yuck (Pat Smear) – 4:14
 Love Your Friends (Maggie Ehrig, Pat Smear, Paul Roessler) – 4:03
 Lazy (Pat Smear) – 3:49

Personnel
Pat Smear - Vocals, Guitar, Bass
Gary Jacoby - Drums
Stephanie Bennett - Harp on "Ever Alone With Thee"
Walter Spencer - Bass on "Love Your Friends" & bass solo on "Innocent X"
Michele Gregg - Chant on "Creep Street"

References

1992 albums
Pat Smear albums
SST Records albums